Protophasma (meaning "first phantom") is an extinct genus of Protorthopteran insect from the Carboniferous of Europe and North America.

Description 
Three species of Protophasma are described, type species, Protophasma dumasii (sometimes mistyped as P. dumasi) is known from Late Carboniferous (Stephanian) Coal Measures of Commentry, France. Protophasma galtieri is known from Mazon Creek fossil beds in Illinois, and Protophasma multidiffusa, originally described as Heterologellus (?) multidiffusus, is known from Germany. Previously assigned species, P. gaudryi later moved to the genus Protodiamphipnoa,  and P. woodwardi moved into genus Cnemidolestes.

P. dumasii have forewings with morphology that allows the assignment of Archaeorthoptera, but hindwings have morphological similarity to Blattodea.

Sources

Evolution of the Insects by David Grimaldi and Michael S. Engel

Carboniferous insects
Prehistoric insects of Europe
Prehistoric insect genera